Nikolai Ivanovich Kharito (Харито, Николай Иванович ; Yalta, 1886 - Tikhoretsk, 1918) was a Russian songwriter. He was shot by a Baron Bongarten at a university friend's wedding in 1918.

Selected works
"My Dear"
"Tell me, girls"
"The Black Eyes"
"The Chrysanthemum Finished Blossoming"

References

1886 births
1918 deaths
Musicians from the Russian Empire